St Agatha’s Church is a parish church in the Landport district of Portsmouth. It is now affiliated to the Roman Catholic Church through the Personal Ordinariate of Our Lady of Walsingham. It is situated on the Marketway next to the Cascades Shopping Centre. It was built in 1838 for the Church of England and is a Grade II* listed building.

History

Construction
Originally, the site had a small mission church situated in an area of extreme deprivation. The church was built because of the efforts of Father Robert William Radclyffe Dolling, an Irish Anglo-Catholic priest. He worked to alleviate the social ills of the area. At the same time he received donations from the residents of Old Portsmouth to build a new church.

The formal opening of the church took place on 27 October 1895 with a ceremony involving mass being said at the old mission church followed by a procession to the new church, but the nature of the ritual led to a row with the Bishop of Winchester.

Establishment
Dolling's successor, Father Tremenheere, continued to decorate the interior until 1914 when another long-serving incumbent arrived. Work done during this time included the completion of the murals and the addition of a wooden pulpit. Tremenheere's successor, Father C. W. Coles, was to serve the parish through two world wars until 1954 when the last service was held.

Traditional Anglican Communion
For the next 40 years it became a naval store until the Traditional Anglican Communion took it over for a form of worship very similar to that originally provided by Dolling. The church survived this time largely intact although the lady chapel was demolished in 1964.

Present
The church is now also used for concerts. It has been described as a magnificent building, as having a sumptuous interior, and the “Cathedral of the car parks” in Portsmouth's shopping district.

Following the reception of the retired Bishop of Matabeleland, Robert Mercer, who worshipped at the church, into the Personal Ordinariate of Our Lady of Walsingham, and other members of the church's clergy, St Agatha's began to be used as a place of worship for the ordinariate.

The church has one Sunday Mass at 11:00 am. It also has weekday Masses at 11:00 am on Monday, Friday and Saturday.

See also
List of places of worship in Portsmouth

References

External links

 Official website

Religious buildings in Portsmouth
Roman Catholic churches in Hampshire
Grade II* listed churches in Hampshire
Roman Catholic churches completed in 1895
Anglo-Catholicism
Personal ordinariates
19th-century Roman Catholic church buildings in the United Kingdom